Así te quiero is a 1942 Argentine romantic drama film directed by Edmo Cominetti and written by Eifel Celesia and Tito Insausti. The film starred Tito Lusiardo and Carlos Morganti.

Cast
 Roberto Blanco
 Angel Boffa
 Antonio Capuano
 Max Citelli
 Mecha Cobos
 Ada Cornaro
 Elda Dessel
 Carlos Dux
 Fausto Etchegoin
 Ramón Garay
 Antonio Gianelli
 Mecha López
 Ángeles Martínez
 José Ruzzo
 Oscar Villa
 Ernesto Villegas

External links
 

1942 films
1940s Spanish-language films
Argentine black-and-white films
1942 romantic drama films
Argentine romantic drama films
1940s Argentine films